The Pearl of Great Price is part of the canonical standard works of the Church of Jesus Christ of Latter-day Saints (LDS Church) and some other Latter Day Saint denominations.

The first paragraph of the Introductory Note in the LDS edition of the Pearl of Great Price states: "The Pearl of Great Price is a selection of choice materials touching many significant aspects of the faith and doctrine of The Church of Jesus Christ of Latter-day Saints. These items were produced by Joseph Smith and were published in the Church periodicals of his day."

The name of the book is derived from the Parable of the Pearl told by Jesus in Matthew 13.

A copy of the Pearl of Great Price owned by NASA photographer M. Edward Thomas's wife Ruth C. Thomas traveled to the Moon and back in 1972 with astronaut John Young aboard Apollo 16.

Contents
The Pearl of Great Price contains five sections:

Book of Moses

The Book of Moses begins with the "Visions of Moses", a prologue to the story of the creation and the fall of man (Moses chapter 1), and continues with material corresponding to Smith's revision (JST) of the first six chapters of the Book of Genesis (Moses chapters 2–5, 8), interrupted by two chapters of "extracts from the prophecy of Enoch" (Moses chapters 6–7). Portions of the Book of Moses were originally published separately by the LDS Church in 1851, but later combined and published as the Book of Moses in the Pearl of Great Price. The same material is published by the Community of Christ as parts of its Doctrine and Covenants and Inspired Version of the Bible.

Book of Abraham

The Book of Abraham is an 1835 work produced by Joseph Smith that he said was based on Egyptian papyri purchased from a traveling mummy exhibition. According to Smith, the book was "a translation of some ancient records ... purporting to be the writings of Abraham, while he was in Egypt, called the Book of Abraham, written by his own hand, upon papyrus". The text that Smith produced describes a story of Abraham's early life, including a vision of the cosmos.

The Book of Abraham was canonized in 1880 by the LDS Church as part of the Pearl of Great Price. Thus, it forms a doctrinal foundation for the LDS Church and Mormon fundamentalist denominations of the Latter Day Saint movement. It is not considered to be a religious text by the Community of Christ. Other sects in the Latter Day Saint movement have various opinions regarding the Book of Abraham, with some rejecting and some accepting the text as inspired scripture. The book contains several doctrines that are distinct to Mormonism, such as the concept of God organizing eternal, pre-existing elements to create the universe instead of creating it ex nihilo.

The Book of Abraham papyri were thought lost in the 1871 Great Chicago Fire. However, in 1966, several fragments of the papyri were found in the archives of the Metropolitan Museum of Art in New York, and in the LDS Church archives. They are now referred to as the Joseph Smith Papyri. Upon examination by professional Mormon and non-Mormon Egyptologists, these fragments were found to bear no resemblance to Smith's interpretation, and were identified as common Egyptian funerary texts, dating to about the first century BC. As a result, the Book of Abraham has been the source of significant controversy, with criticism from Egyptologists and Mormon apologists defending its authenticity.

Joseph Smith–Matthew

Joseph Smith–Matthew (abbreviated JS–M) is an excerpt from Joseph Smith's "retranslation" of portions of the Gospel of Matthew. It was originally published in 1831 in Kirtland, Ohio, in an undated broadsheet as "Extract from the New Translation of the Bible".

Joseph Smith–Matthew includes Smith's retranslation of Matthew 23:39 and all of Matthew chapter 24. The text deals mainly with Jesus' prophecy of the coming destruction of Jerusalem and of similar calamities that will precede his Second Coming. Joseph Smith–Matthew contains significant changes and additions to the original biblical text.

Joseph Smith–History

Joseph Smith–History (abbreviated JS–H) is an excerpt from the autobiographical record of some of the early events in Joseph Smith's life. Like many of Smith's publications, it was dictated to a scribe.

The incidents described in Joseph Smith–History include the First Vision and the visitation of the angel Moroni. In its current form, the narrative ends with Smith translating the Book of Mormon, shortly before the foundation of Smith's Church of Christ, though the original Times and Seasons serial it is based on continued the story until the mid-1830s.

Articles of Faith
 
The Articles of Faith are a creed composed by Joseph Smith as part of an 1842 letter sent to "Long" John Wentworth, editor of the Chicago Democrat, and first published in the Latter Day Saint newspaper Times and Seasons. It is a concise listing of thirteen fundamental doctrines of Mormonism. Most Latter Day Saint denominations view the articles as an authoritative statement of basic theology. For some sects, they are known collectively as "An Epitome of Faith and Doctrine".

Changes
The original contents of the Pearl of Great Price were significantly different, reproducing material found in the Doctrine and Covenants and a poem entitled "Oh Say What is Truth?" (which is now found in the LDS Church hymnal). In 1878, some material was added to the Book of Moses. The Pearl of Great Price was canonized by the LDS Church in 1880. In 1902, the material reproduced in the Doctrine and Covenants was removed. Two other documents, Vision of the Celestial Kingdom and Vision of the Redemption of the Dead, were added to the Pearl of Great Price in 1976 and moved to the LDS Church edition of the Doctrine and Covenants (sections 137 and 138) in 1979.

1851 edition
The Pearl of Great Price was first compiled by Franklin D. Richards in Liverpool, England. Some items duplicated text that was already available in the Doctrine and Covenants. It contained the following entries (the placement of the text in today's LDS Church publications is noted in parenthesis):

Extracts from the Prophecy of Enoch (Moses 6:43–7:69)
A message from God, given to Moses (Moses 1:1–42)
Untitled (Moses 2:1–5; 8:13–30)
The Book of Abraham including Facsimile Nos. 1, 2 and 3 from the Book of Abraham (Book of Abraham)
An extract from a Translation of the Bible (Joseph Smith–Matthew)
A Key to the Revelations of St. John (Doctrine and Covenants 77)
A Revelation and Prophecy (Doctrine and Covenants 87)
Extracts from the History of Joseph Smith (Joseph Smith–History)
From the Doctrine and Covenants of the Church Commandment to the Church concerning baptism (Doctrine and Covenants 20:37, 71–75)
The duties of members after they are received by baptism (Doctrine and Covenants 20:68–69)
Method of administering the Sacrament of the Lord's Supper (Doctrine and Covenants 20:75–79)
The Duties of the Elders, Priests, Teachers, Deacons, and Members of the Church of Christ (Doctrine and Covenants 20:38–44; 107:11; 20:45–59, 70, 80)
On Priesthood (Doctrine and Covenants 107:1–10, 12–20)
The Calling and Duties of the Twelve Apostles (Doctrine and Covenants 107:23, 33)
The Calling and Duties of the Seventy (Doctrine and Covenants 107:34, 93–100)
Extract from a revelation given July, 1830 (Doctrine and Covenants 27:5–18)
Rise of the Church of Jesus Christ of Latter-day Saints (Doctrine and Covenants 20:1–36)
Times and Seasons, vol. III, p. 709 (Articles of Faith)
"Truth" (a poem by John Jaques) ("O Say, What is Truth?", #272 in LDS Church hymnal) (not a canonized work)

Notes

References

.
.

Further reading

External links

The  at Wikisource
The Pearl of Great Price, full HTML text, official LDS Church edition, churchofjesuschrist.org
The Pearl of Great Price  official LDS Church edition (pdf)
Digitized copy of The Pearl of Great Price (1851) in the Rare Book and Special Collections Division in the Library of Congress
Introductory note to The Pearl of Great Price, churchofjesuschrist.org
"historical notes on The Pearl of Great Price", boap.org
Pearl of Great Price - Contents listed by edition
The 1851 Pearl of Great Price (first edition) at Wikisource
  (1920 edition)

 
1851 non-fiction books
1851 in Christianity
Works in the style of the King James Version
Standard works